Jane Withers (April 12, 1926 – August 7, 2021) was an American actress and children's radio show host. She became one of the most popular child stars in Hollywood in the 1930s and early 1940s, with her films ranking in the top ten list for box-office gross in 1937 and 1938.

She began her entertainment career at the age of three and, during the Golden Age of Radio, hosted her own children's radio program in her home city of Atlanta, Georgia. In 1932, she and her mother moved to Hollywood, where she appeared as an extra in many films until landing her breakthrough role as the spoiled, obnoxious Joy Smythe opposite Shirley Temple's angelic orphan Shirley Blake in the 1934 film Bright Eyes. She made 38 films before retiring at age 21 in 1947. She returned to film and television as a character actor in the 1950s. From 1963 to 1974, she portrayed the character Josephine the Plumber in a series of television commercials for Comet cleanser. In the 1990s and early 2000s, she did voice work for Disney animated films. She was interviewed in numerous documentary retrospectives of the Golden Age of Hollywood. She was also known for her philanthropy and her extensive doll collection.

Early life
Jane Withers was born on April 12, 1926, in Atlanta, Georgia, the only child of Walter Edward Withers and Lavinia Ruth (née Elble) Withers. Ruth had had her own aspirations to be an actress nixed by her parents. She determined before Jane was born that she would have one daughter who would go into show business, and chose the name Jane so that "even with a long last name like Withers, it would fit on a marquee". Ruth taught Sunday school and Walter taught Bible classes in their local Presbyterian church. The family recited blessings at mealtime and devoted themselves to charitable works, which stood with Jane her entire life. Both in Atlanta and in Hollywood, the family would invite "six busloads of orphan children" to come to their home after church and Sunday school for lunch and afternoon entertainment.

When Jane was two, Ruth enrolled her in a tap dance school, and also taught her to sing. Jane launched her entertainment career at the age of three after winning a local amateur contest called Dixie's Dainty Dewdrop. She was cast on Aunt Sally's Kiddie Revue, a Saturday-morning children's program broadcast on WGST radio in Atlanta, in which she sang, danced, and did impersonations of film stars such as W. C. Fields, ZaSu Pitts, Maurice Chevalier, Fanny Brice, Eddie Cantor, and Greta Garbo. At age 3½ she had her own radio show called Dixie's Dainty Dewdrop, where she also interviewed celebrities who were visiting Atlanta.

Move to Hollywood

After two years of her radio work, Ruth took Jane to Hollywood before her sixth birthday in 1932 to explore opportunities in film. Walter remained in Atlanta, sending them $100 a month on which to live. In Los Angeles, Jane performed on children's shows on KFWB radio, did cartoon voice-overs, and also modeled. She got her first film role as an extra when their neighbor invited her to come along for her daughter's interview for Handle with Care (1932). Withers stood to the side while the other children interviewed with director David Butler. The assistant director came over and asked her why she was not standing with the others. "Sir, I was not invited to the interview. I came with our friends", she replied. The assistant director told her that Butler had seen her and wanted her to interview as well. Handle with Care was Withers's first film appearance, though she and all the children were photographed with their backs to the camera.

Withers subsequently appeared in many films as an uncredited extra, though occasionally she had a line of dialogue. She stood out from the other girls at auditions because of her appearance: she had a Dutchboy bob and preferred tailored clothes to frilly dresses. "Every interview I ever went on I was the only one with a tailored dress, with straight bangs and straight haircut, and no curls and no frills", she recalled. Butler was the first to notice this about her. He told her, "You're different than any other kid that I've ever seen in Hollywood. You've got a special quality and someday you are going to be a famous little star".

Withers was working as an extra on It's a Gift (1934), when W. C. Fields selected her from a group of juvenile extras to do a pantomime hopscotch scene with him. Afterwards, he praised her timing and called over her mother to compliment her on Jane's talent and predict that she would go far.

Withers's big break came after two years when she landed a supporting role in the Shirley Temple film Bright Eyes (also 1934), also directed by Butler. On her interview, Butler asked her if she could imitate a machine gun, and she gave it a try. She also charmed the casting director with her impersonations. Her character, Joy Smythe, is spoiled and obnoxious, a perfect foil for Temple's sweet personality. Withers was concerned that filmgoers would hate her for being so mean to Temple, but the film was a box-office hit. Withers said that director Butler confided to her, "You stole the picture".

After filming wrapped, Withers signed a seven-year contract with Fox Film Corporation. Included in her contract was the right to choose the crew members who would work on her productions. Her crew, dubbed the "Withers Family", worked on all her subsequent films.

After Withers signed her contract with Fox, her mother invested $10,000 into developing additional skills to improve her versatility as an actress, with the intention of spending $20,000 over an eight-year period. This included "ice skating lessons, voice training, horsemanship, dancing, French, Spanish, and swimming lessons".

Child stardom

Withers began filming her first starring vehicle, Ginger (1935), on her ninth birthday. She received two baskets of flowers on the set that day—one from Fields, to whom she had written about her casting in Bright Eyes, and one from President Franklin D. Roosevelt, who had seen her impersonate him on a newsreel. The same year, she appeared in a brief role in The Farmer Takes a Wife and then starred in This Is the Life. Her day of filming in The Farmer Takes a Wife coincided with Henry Fonda's screen debut, and noticing his nervousness, she encouraged him and offered a prayer for his success.

Throughout the remainder of the 1930s, Withers appeared in three to five films per year. In 1936, she starred in Paddy O'Day, Gentle Julia, Little Miss Nobody, and Pepper. In 1937, she performed in comedies, dramas, and a Western with lead roles in The Holy Terror, Angel's Holiday, Wild and Woolly, Can This Be Dixie?, 45 Fathers, and Checkers. In 1938, she filmed three comedies for Fox: Rascals, Keep Smiling, and Always in Trouble. In 1939 she appeared in four more comedy roles: The Arizona Wildcat, Boy Friend, Chicken Wagon Family, and Pack Up Your Troubles. Withers often received top billing even over other established stars.

Withers did not memorize her lines verbatim, but tried to think about them and draw out the "sense" from them; she often ad-libbed when she lost her way in a scene. A natural mimic, she did impersonations of film celebrities both on and off the set. Twentieth Century Fox studio head Darryl Zanuck reportedly forbade her from doing her Shirley Temple impersonation in public.

Withers freely gave her input to screenwriters and directors. From a young age, she sat in on writers' conferences to suggest changes in dialogue that would be more appropriate for a child to say. She also suggested the casting of other actors for her films, including Jackie Searl, whom she had met at auditions, and 16-year-old Rita Cansino (later renamed Rita Hayworth), whom she had observed dancing on an adjoining sound stage and recommended for a supporting role in Paddy O'Day. At age 13, she took the initiative to make a film with Gene Autry by acting as a go-between between 20th Century Fox studio head Joseph M. Schenck and Republic Pictures head Herbert J. Yates. Though neither studio was willing to loan their star player to the other, Withers suggested that Fox send three other contract players to Republic Pictures in exchange for Autry, who was paid $25,000 to co-star with Withers in Shooting High (1940).

Withers was the only child star to complete a seven-year contract. Studio contracts generally included a series of six-month option periods when the studio could terminate the agreement should the actor's films stop making money. Since all but one of her films were low-budget B movies, the studio held Withers to a lower standard than an A-movie actor whose films would cost the studio much more money. Additionally, the lower rental fees for Withers's B movies allowed her films to be screened in many more small theaters, expanding Withers's popularity. In 1937 and 1938, Withers's films made the top 10 list in box-office gross receipts. In addition to her studio contract, Withers made personal appearance tours for which she received $5,000 a week.

Teen years

She had her first screen kiss in the 1939 film Boy Friend. In 1940 she filmed Shooting High with co-star Gene Autry, and starred in the teen films High School, The Girl from Avenue A, and Youth Will Be Served. But she and her fans grew dissatisfied with the juvenile roles being offered her as she matured. Under the pseudonym Jerrie Walters, Withers wrote the screenplay for Small Town Deb (1941), in which she also starred. Withers explained in a 2003 interview that "her own experiences of not being allowed by the studio to grow up were translated into the story of a teenage girl whose 'mother isn't allowing her to grow up, to be herself and to find herself'". As payment for the script, Withers requested that the studio provide fifteen $1,500 scholarships for children to study music and acting, and two upright pianos, for her Sunday school groups.

In 1941, Withers signed her second seven-year contract with 20th Century Fox. She was set to earn $2,750 a week in the first year of the contract and $3,000 per week in the second year. Her other films this year for 20th Century Fox were comedies: Golden Hoofs and A Very Young Lady. Her last films for Fox were the war drama Young America and the comedy film The Mad Martindales, both in 1942. She also made Her First Beau (1941) for Columbia Pictures.

In 1942, Withers signed a three-year, $225,000 contract with Republic Pictures. Her Republic films were Johnny Doughboy (1942), My Best Gal and Faces in the Fog (both 1944), and Affairs of Geraldine (1946). Her other films in the 1940s were The North Star (1943) for RKO Pictures and Danger Street (1947) for Paramount Pictures.

Screen persona

Withers and Shirley Temple were the two most popular child stars signed to 20th Century Fox in the 1930s. In contrast to Temple's cute and charming characters, Withers was usually cast as a mischievous little girl or "a tomboy rascal", leading to her being described as "America's favorite problem child". Zierold noted that Withers's characters are "often in trouble, or 'fixes', and prone to brawls". Hollywood gossip columnist Louella Parsons described Withers as "a natural clown". As a child, Withers's "stocky and sturdy" build and straight black hair also contrasted with Temple's "pudgy but delicate" figure and blonde ringlets. Both Withers and Temple usually played orphans and had a transformative effect on those around them. But while Temple was cared for by father figures, Withers was usually under the protection of uncles, both real and imaginary; according to Pamela Wojcik, author of Fantasies of Neglect: Imagining the Urban Child in American Film and Fiction, this introduced the narrative of queerness through alternative family structures.

Withers's bratty screen persona continued into her teens. According to Farley Granger, Withers was "cast as the obnoxious, smart-aleck teen as opposed to Deanna Durbin's or Judy Garland's plucky and adorable adolescent".

Parents and home life

While Withers typically played a brat onscreen, off-screen she was said to be "one of Hollywood's most charming and well-behaved juveniles". Her parents closely supervised her upbringing to make sure she did not grow up spoiled or entitled. In a 1942 newspaper article, Ruth described how she and her husband encouraged Jane to develop a generous personality and avoid the egoism and self-centeredness that a child star might accrue as the object of adoring fans and studio "sycophants".

For example, as Withers began to receive gifts of dolls from fans to add to her collection, her parents insisted that for every two dolls she received, she give away one to a needy child. When she began to purchase dolls to build the collection further, her parents mandated that she should use her allowance money to buy duplicate dolls for less fortunate children. Her earnings from film roles were invested in trust funds and annuities; Withers had to use her allowance money to buy things she wanted for herself, which often meant saving up for weeks. In 1938, her allowance was reported as $5 a week; this was raised to $10 a week in 1941.

To ease the pressured life of a child star, Withers' parents made sure she also had fun, but kept her activities supervised and close to home. Withers joined the Girl Scouts and her parents hosted the meeting in their home. The Withers' home, a  model home at 10731 Sunset Boulevard they bought in 1936, was equipped with a swimming pool, badminton court, and a -long playroom that saw frequent use by Withers and her fellow Hollywood child actors. Her afternoon swim parties continued into her teens and were the subject of many a fan magazine. When she became a teenager, her parents built a second-floor addition that included a beauty salon and soda fountain where Withers could entertain her friends. As a child, she also accumulated a menagerie of two horses, three kittens, "eight turtles, three baby alligators, 24 white Leghorn chickens, 12 turkeys, 2 Chinese hens", a rooster, six bantams, two ducks, seven frogs, and six dogs. At the family's cabin in Lake Arrowhead, where they vacationed on weekends and holidays, Withers had two motorbikes and a boat.

Withers' birthday parties, described as "the social event of the season for movietown's small fry", were annually covered by the media. For her twelfth birthday, her parents hired a 21-seat cargo plane for $18,000 to give party guests a low-altitude ride. Withers' thirteenth birthday party saw 60 young guests come in costume and participate in a balloon dance and jitterbug contest; this party earned a two-page pictorial spread in Life magazine. Withers's "sweet sixteen" party in 1942, with 150 invited guests and a hayride and barn dance on the program, was filmed by Paramount Pictures for the Hedda Hopper's Hollywood series. The short was transferred to 16 mm film for viewing by U.S. troops overseas during World War II. Withers had her eighteenth birthday party at Madison Square Garden with a circus theme and invited U.S. servicemen and their dates to be her guests. Her twenty-first birthday party was planned for a nightclub with 200 guests, but after she came down with the flu, Withers instead served cake and ice cream and watched movies in her personal suite at home with 12 close friends.

Withers was allowed to go on chaperoned dates with boys of her age in her early teens; by age 16 she was permitted to go on solo dates. After a 1936 kidnapping threat, she was always accompanied by round-the-clock bodyguards.

During Withers' first 15 years in film, Ruth "handled all negotiations with producers, supervised publicity, [and] completely managed Jane's off-screen life". However, Ruth was not a typical stage mother. She was usually present on the sound stage but did not watch Jane film her scenes; nor did she ever issue instructions or objections to studio personnel. Walter Withers did not involve himself in the movie business at all, but worked as a representative for a California wholesale furniture company.

Product licensing

Withers' parents licensed her name and image to numerous product lines. As early as 1936, her name was affixed to a line of "Jane Withers Dresses" for girls, and girls' handbags and jewelry were also branded with her name. She was the star of best-selling paper doll books issued by Whitman Publishing, Saalfield Publishing, and Dell in the late 1930s and 1940s, which later became popular collectables. She was also featured in several Big Little Books published by Whitman Publishing.

In the 1940s, Withers was featured as the heroine of three mystery novels published by Whitman Publishing, which produced 16 authorized editions featuring notable film actresses of that era. The books Jane Withers and the Hidden Room (1942) by Eleanor Packer and Jane Withers and the Phantom Violin (1943) by Roy J. Snell "featured a character who looked like Jane Withers and was named Jane Withers but was not Jane Withers". Jane Withers and the Swamp Wizard (1944) by Kathryn Heisenfelt was said to "star some version of the real Jane Withers". The books were reprinted by Literary Licensing in the 21st century.

Retirement at age 21
In the early 1940s, Hollywood's child-star genre that had catapulted Withers to fame was on the decline. Her popularity in comedy films also hindered her acceptance as a dramatic actress in films such as The North Star (1943). Withers retired from film at age 21 in 1947, shortly after completing Danger Street and nine days before her marriage to William Moss, a Texas entrepreneur and film producer. She had starred in 38 films.

A month after Jane's twenty-first birthday, her mother Ruth appeared in a California Superior Court and listed her daughter's assets as $40,401.85. The judge turned the property over to Jane's control. The same month, her parents turned over to her the deed to their home, valued at $250,000, and other real estate worth $75,000, plus annuities totaling $10,000, all purchased from Withers's earnings.

Her father died the following year. Ruth remarried to Louis D. Boonshaft, a physician.

Return to the screen and television work

In 1955, a year after her divorce, Withers returned to Los Angeles and enrolled in the University of Southern California film school with the intention of becoming a director. She returned to the screen when George Stevens asked her to take a supporting role in his 1956 film Giant. In 2006, Withers participated in a 50th-anniversary screening of the film for 700 attendees in Marfa, Texas, where location shooting had taken place.

Her performance in Giant led to more work as a character actor in both film and television. She appeared in television episodes of Pete and Gladys; General Electric Theater; The Alfred Hitchcock Hour; The Love Boat; and Murder, She Wrote. Though she received "dozens of offers" to do television series as well as stage musicals such as Mame; Hello, Dolly!; and No, No, Nanette, Withers was financially comfortable and chose to spend most of her time raising her children.

Josephine the Plumber fame

In the mid-1960s, Withers gained new popularity as Josephine the Plumber, a character in a series of television commercials for Comet cleanser. The commercials, featuring Withers dressed in white work overalls and in the proximity of a sink, had her touting Comet's stain-removing ability compared to other cleansers. The one-minute spots, which ran from 1963 to 1974, involved Withers in up to 30 storylines per year.

Withers invested much of her own personality into the character of Josephine, making her friendly, caring, and helpful. She also selected the type of work clothes a woman plumber would wear based on what she herself wore at home. She took a course in plumbing to play her part realistically. Her earnings from the long-running commercial helped her pay for a college education for all five of her children.

Withers retired as Josephine after her mother Ruth was diagnosed with a brain tumor. She cared for her mother for eight years until Ruth's death in 1983. The character of Josephine was described by the Los Angeles Times as being "one of the longest-running continuing characters in TV." Before retiring, Withers filmed two installments of the commercial introducing a young girl who had learned everything she knew about plumbing from "my aunt Josephine".

Stage work
In late 1944, Withers made her stage debut in the musical comedy Glad To See You directed by Busby Berkeley. The show, intended for Broadway, closed after seven weeks of tryouts in Philadelphia and Boston. Withers sang the Jule Styne-Sammy Cahn torch song "Guess I'll Hang My Tears Out to Dry" written for the play; this was soon after covered by Frank Sinatra and Kate Smith and became a jazz and pop standard.

In 1971, Withers co-starred in the Broadway musical comedy Sure, Sure, Shirley which also brought Shirley Temple Black out of retirement. The performance, which featured a tap dancing sequence with 50 chorus dancers, was staged as an opening-night benefit for diabetics.

Voice work
In the 1990s, Withers did voice acting for Disney animated films. In 1995, she was asked to record several lines of dialogue in imitation of the vocal patterns of Mary Wickes, who had recorded the voice of Laverne the gargoyle in The Hunchback of Notre Dame (1996) and had died during post-production. Withers reprised the role in The Hunchback of Notre Dame II (2002).

Withers narrated audiobooks, including a reading of Why Not Try God? by Mary Pickford which was distributed through a Southern California religious organization.

In the 1990s, she was interviewed on numerous television documentary retrospectives of the Golden Age of Hollywood. She herself was profiled in a 45-minute A&E Biography which aired in 2003.

In 1990, Withers began experiencing symptoms of lupus. She suffered from the disease over a period of ten years, after which she went into remission. She began experiencing vertigo in 2007.

Other activities

Doll collection
Withers began collecting dolls as a young child in Atlanta. The collection, enlarged by contributions from her fans, grew into one of the largest in the world. By the early 1940s, the collection was estimated at 3,500 dolls. By the 1980s, the collection numbered more than 8,000 dolls and 2,500 teddy bears. Withers purchased some of the dolls herself and received presents from fans; President Franklin D. Roosevelt sent her one of his teddy bears and First Lady Eleanor Roosevelt contributed a French doll she had received as a child.

In the 1980s, Withers announced plans to build a $1 million museum in Burbank, California, to display her collection, then stored in a  warehouse. But the plans fell through and the dolls, along with crates of Hollywood film memorabilia that Withers had also collected during her film career or purchased at auction, continued to be warehoused. In 2004, the Los Angeles Times reported Withers had distributed more than 42,000 items for safekeeping among friends. A small part of the doll collection was sold at auction, and Withers participated in tours of her collection held in conjunction with these auctions. In 2013, she donated 6,000 of her dolls to a history museum in California.

Philanthropy
Withers engaged in philanthropy throughout her life. As a child star, she visited orphanages and hospitals to perform for other children. In 1937, she created 400 dolls using scraps she had recovered from the 20th Century Fox wardrobe department and gave them to needy children at Christmas. During World War II, she participated in more than 100 war bond drives and soldiers' camp tours in the United States. She also sent her personal doll collection—then numbering some 3,500 dolls—on a two-year tour which raised $2.5 million in funds for the U.S. war effort through 10-cent war savings stamp admissions. She involved President Roosevelt in this initiative, requesting from him the loan of a train on which she had the dolls arranged in museum-like displays to be seen by children across the country.

Withers donated 800 books from her personal library to start the Jane Withers Collection at the Thousand Oaks Library in Thousand Oaks, California.

Affiliations
Withers was active in dozens of charities. She served as a board member of the local branch of the American Cancer Society and the Hollywood Chamber of Commerce, and was instrumental in the development of the Hollywood Walk of Fame.

Recognition
On November 6, 1939, Withers was invited to place her handprints and signature in the forecourt of Grauman's Chinese Theatre. On February 8, 1960, she was recognized for her contribution to film with a star on the Hollywood Walk of Fame, located at 6119 Hollywood Boulevard.

In 1979, Withers was the first recipient of the Young Artist Former Child Star Lifetime Achievement Award at the 1st Youth in Film Awards ceremony.

In 2003, she was the recipient of a Living Legacy Award from the Women's International Center, a non-profit education and service organization.

Personal life

Marriages and children
In May 1947, Withers announced her engagement to William (Bill) Moss, a Texas entrepreneur and film producer, after a two-year courtship. They married on September 20, 1947. The couple lived on ranches in Midland, Texas, and New Mexico with their three children. They separated in April 1953 and Withers was granted a divorce in July 1954, citing her husband's "excessive drinking and gambling". She received a $1 million property settlement, including monthly alimony and child support, trust fund and insurance fund for the children, and a half-interest in Texas oil fields owned by Moss, as well as full custody of the children. Suffering from emotional strain over the impending divorce, Withers was hospitalized for five months in 1953 with severe rheumatoid arthritis and developed complete paralysis. She recovered with no lasting effects.

In October 1955, Withers remarried, to singer Kenneth Errair of The Four Freshmen, with whom she had two more children. In June 1968, Errair died in a plane crash near Bass Lake, California. One of Withers's sons later died of cancer.

Religion
Withers was a devout Christian. Like her parents, she belonged to the Presbyterian Church. She taught Sunday school at the Beverly Hills Presbyterian Church together with the actresses Eleanor Powell and Gloria Hatrick McLean. She was a trustee of the Church of Religious Science in Los Angeles.

Death
Withers died in Burbank, California, on August 7, 2021, at the age of 95.

Filmography

References

Sources

Bibliography

Further reading

External links

 
 
 
 "Jane Withers Displays Talent" British Movietone newsreel, August 31, 1936
 "Jane Withers, Mary Martin – 1981 TV Interview"

1926 births
2021 deaths
American film actresses
American child actresses
American child models
American television actresses
American voice actresses
Actresses from Atlanta
20th Century Studios contract players
American Presbyterians
20th-century American actresses
21st-century American actresses